Sheridan Township, Nebraska may refer to the following places:

Sheridan Township, Clay County, Nebraska
Sheridan Township, Holt County, Nebraska
Sheridan Township, Phelps County, Nebraska

See also
Sheridan Township (disambiguation)

Nebraska township disambiguation pages